Henry Kwasi Prempeh is a Ghanaian lawyer, educationalist and executive director of the Ghana Center for Democratic Development (CDD-Ghana).

Education 
Prempeh graduated with a B.sc Admin. degree from the University of Ghana. He obtained a master's degree in Business Administration (MBA) from Baylor University (Texas, USA). He is a graduate of Yale Law School (New Haven, Connecticut, USA), where he served as a teaching fellow and on the Yale Law Journal as an editor.

Career 
Prempeh worked in private practice as a Law firm associate after graduating from Law school. He worked at O'Melveny & Myers LLP and later, Cleary, Gottlieb, Steen and Hamilton in Washington, D.C. In 1998, he was appointed to be a board member of the newly formed Ghana Center for Democratic Development (CDD-Ghana) and served as the Director of Legal Policy and Governance. He also served on the board of Ashesi University, a private university in Ghana. In 2003 Prempeh was appointed a professor of law at Seton Hall University School of Law, Newark, New Jersey, where he has taught constitutional, corporate, and international business law courses.

In 2010, he was a visiting professor at the newly established Law school at the Ghana Institute of Management and Public Administration in Accra. He has written and consulted on the issues of constitutionalism, governance, legal policy, and democracy in Ghana and the rest of Africa. He was selected as a Reagan-Fascell Democracy Fellow by the National Endowment for Democracy in 2011. He is a founding patron and chairman of the board of Walk2Learn International and was a member of the Ghana Law Reform Commission.

Professor Henry Kwasi Prempeh, was appointed as the new executive director for the Ghana Centre for Democratic Development (CDD-Ghana) on February 1, 2018, following the retirement of the centre's founding executive director, Professor E. Gyimah-Boadi

See also 

 Afrobarometer

References 

Living people
People associated with Cleary Gottlieb Steen & Hamilton
Seton Hall University School of Law faculty
Year of birth missing (living people)
University of Ghana alumni
Baylor University alumni
Yale Law School alumni